Armando Castellazzi (7 October 1904 – 4 January 1968) was an Italian professional footballer and manager who played as a midfielder.

Club career
Born in Milan, Castellazzi spent his entire club career in the 1920s and 1930s playing for Ambrosiana-Inter in Serie A. He played 261 match in all competitions for the team, scoring 16 goals, helping the club to win the 1929–30 Serie A championship. His club debut came on 6 October 1929, in a 2–1 away win over Livorno.

International career
With the Italy national team, Castellazzi made three appearances between 1929 and 1934; he made his international debut on 1 December 1929, in a 6–1 friendly home win over Portugal in Milan, and later appeared in a 4–2 friendly home win over Switzerland in Rome, on 9 February 1930. He also made one appearance – his final international cap – in the team's victorious 1934 FIFA World Cup campaign on home soil, starting in the first quarter-final against Spain, held in Florence, on 31 May, which ended in a 1–1 draw.

Managerial career
After retiring from football at the age of 32, Castellazzi remained with the Ambrosiana-Inter organization where in 1938 he became the first person in the history of the first division to win the championship both as a player and as a coach.

Career statistics

International
Source:

Honours

Player

Club
Ambrosiana-Inter
Serie A: 1929–30

International
Italy
FIFA World Cup: 1934

Coach

Club
Ambrosiana-Inter
Serie A: 1937–38

References

External links
 Profile at Enciclopedia del Calcio 
 Profile at FIGC 
 La Gazzetta dello Sport 

1904 births
1968 deaths
Footballers from Milan
Italian footballers
Italy international footballers
Association football midfielders
Serie A players
Inter Milan players
Inter Milan managers
Serie A managers
1934 FIFA World Cup players
FIFA World Cup-winning players
Italian football managers